Santa Efigênia is a Belo Horizonte Metro station on Line 1. It was opened in April 1992 as a one-station extension of the line from Central. In December 1992 the line was extended to Horto. The station is located between Central and Santa Tereza.

References

Belo Horizonte Metro stations
1992 establishments in Brazil
Railway stations opened in 1992